Bagh Gol or Bagh-e Gol may refer to:
 Bagh-e Gol, Isfahan
 Bagh-e Gol, Kerman
 Bagh Gol, Tehran
 Bagh-e Gol Gol